Hugh McLaughlin (1945 – 21 July 2020) was a Scottish professional footballer who played as a wing half and inside forward for Denny B.C., Stirling Albion, Third Lanark, St Mirren, Queen of the South and Cambuslang Rangers.

He died on 21 July 2020 following a long illness.

References

1945 births
2020 deaths
Scottish footballers
Stirling Albion F.C. players
Third Lanark A.C. players
St Mirren F.C. players
Queen of the South F.C. players
Cambuslang Rangers F.C. players
Scottish Football League players
Association football wing halves
Association football inside forwards